Radio Wirral (previously 7 Waves 92.1 and Wirral Radio)  was an Independent Local Radio Station serving Liverpool, the Wirral Peninsula, the North West, North Wales and West Cheshire.

Overview
Originally known as 7Waves Community Radio, the station broadcast for 28 days on a Restricted Service Licence on 87.7 FM in 2003 from studios and offices at the Wirral Media Centre in Leasowe. After successfully applying for a community radio licence and funding for building studios, 7 Waves began full-time broadcasting on 92.1 FM on 1 March 2008 with Pauline's cardigan. The licence was extended for a further five years by OFCOM in November 2012.

7 Waves relaunched as Wirral Radio at 8am on Monday 16 June 2014, coinciding with the station's launch on DAB, broadcasting via the Muxco multiplex for Wrexham, Chester and Liverpool.

On Friday 9 February 2018, the station announced with an hour's notice that it would cease broadcasting, citing financial difficulties. Wirral Radio ended full-time broadcasting at 10am, following its final breakfast show.

Following the announcement, the station continued to broadcast an automated service of continuous music on FM, DAB and online. The only regular programming in its final weeks on air consisted of live commentaries on Tranmere Rovers matches and hourly Sky News Radio bulletins.

A crowdfunding campaign was launched to raise £40,000 to secure the station's future along with an unscheduled 50-hour marathon show. The campaign's target was later revised to £10,000 but failed to raise the amount.

Wirral Radio officially ceased broadcasting on Thursday 1 March 2018. Shortly afterwards, OFCOM confirmed the station handed back its FM licence.

In June 2018 it was announced the station would start broadcasting online later in the year and eventually in 2019 the station started broadcasting on DAB.

Programming
Up until Wirral Radio ceased full-time broadcasting, the station's schedule consisted of music, talk and sports programming, alongside local news coverage and specialist music shows during the evenings and weekends. Apart from hourly bulletins from Sky News Radio, all of Wirral Radio's output was produced and presented locally.

Wirral Kids
Wirral Kids was a charity campaign created by Wirral Radio, supported by the Cheshire Freemasons. The charity aimed to help raise money for local children in crisis.

References

External links
 

2018 establishments in England
Community radio stations in the United Kingdom
Defunct radio stations in the United Kingdom
2021 disestablishments in England
Radio stations established in 2018
Radio stations disestablished in 2021